The 2018 European Junior and U23 Canoe Slalom Championships took place in Bratislava, Slovakia from 16 to 19 August 2018 under the auspices of the European Canoe Association (ECA) at the Čunovo Water Sports Centre. It was the 20th edition of the competition for Juniors (U18) and the 16th edition for the Under 23 category. A total of 16 medal events took place, 8 in each of the two age categories. In addition, there were two exhibition events. One in the discontinued men's C2 category and the other in the mixed C2. The senior Freestyle European Championships were held as part of the same event.

Medal summary

Men

Canoe

Junior

U23

Kayak

Junior

U23

Women

Canoe

Junior

U23

Kayak

Junior

U23

Exhibition

Two exhibition events took place at the championships. The U23 men's C2 event had three boats competing. The U23 mixed C2 event had three entries, but only one boat started. It was a single run competition and no medals were awarded.

U23 Men

U23 Mixed

Medal table

References

External links
European Canoe Association
Official website

European Junior and U23 Canoe Slalom Championships
International sports competitions hosted by Slovakia
Sports competitions in Bratislava
European Junior and U23 Canoe Slalom Championships
European Junior and U23 Canoe Slalom Championships
European Junior and U23 Canoe Slalom Championships
European Junior and U23 Canoe Slalom Championships